Redrock Mountain Natural Area Preserve is a  Natural Area Preserve located in Smyth County, Virginia. The preserve is named for the  Redrock Mountain, which itself is named for its red siltstone cliffs. It supports a number of rare natural features, and two natural community types, including examples of "mountain/piedmont basic woodlands" upon the mountain's slopes, and "rich cove/slope forests" in the preserve's lowlands. Five rare plant species are found on the property, including spring blue-eyed Mary (Collinsia verna), fringed scorpion-weed (Phacelia fimbriata), and Carey saxifrage (Saxifraga careyana).

The expansion connected the preserve with the Clinch Mountain Wildlife Management Area, located nearby.

The preserve is owned and maintained by the Virginia Department of Conservation and Recreation. It does not include improvements for public access, and visitors must make arrangements with a state-employed land steward prior to visiting.

See also
 List of Virginia Natural Area Preserves

References

External links
Virginia Department of Conservation and Recreation: Redrock Mountain Natural Area Preserve

Virginia Natural Area Preserves
Protected areas of Smyth County, Virginia